Gerhard Wimberger (30 August 1923 – 12 October 2016) was an Austrian composer and conductor.

Career
Wimberger studied at the Mozarteum in Salzburg. His teachers were Cesar Bresgen and Johann Nepomuk David for composition, and Clemens Krauss and Bernhard Paumgartner for conducting.

After World War II, in which he served in the army, he worked as vocal coach at the Vienna Volksoper, then as conductor at the Salzburg Theatre, before becoming a teacher for conducting and composition at the Mozarteum. Among his many pupils were Klaus Ager, Sergio Cárdenas, Dieter Lehnhoff, and Gerd Kühr. Wimberger also served as member of the directory of the Salzburg Festival, and as president of the Austrian Composers' Association AKM.

He died in October 2016 at the age of 93. A memorial concert was held in his honor at the Mozarteum in January 2017.

Scenic works
Heinrich und Kleist, Scenes for Music Theatre (2004), chamber opera (2011 )
Wolf Dietrich Prince of Salzburg (1985/87), scenic chronicles
Paradou (1981/58), opera after Émile Zola
The Golden Shoes (1983), ballet music for television
Jedermann (1983), incidental music
Rules of Life (1970/73), scenic music
Helen the Victim (1967), musical
Lady Clown (1963/64), musical comedy
Hero and Leander (1962/63), dance drama
La Battaglia or the Red Feathers, opera
Display Story (1952/53)

Concert music
Musica Cellisima (2003), cello and orchestra
Musica Tranquilla (2000), orchestra
Strange Evening Music (1999), chamber orchestra
Flows (1997), string sextet
Combophony (1995), 7 instruments
Premonitions (1994), orchestra
Burletta (1993), violin, piano
In the Name of Love (1992), tenor, piano
Dance Concerto (1991/92), chamber orchestra
Vanity in the Life of a Manager (1991/92), voices and orchestra
Disegni (1991), piano
Three Sonatas for Synthesizer (1990–91)
Quintet (1990), classical wind quintet
Diary 1942 (1990/91), baritone, chorus, orchestra
Concerto for Synthesizer (1989)
Vagabondage (1988), big band
We Do Not Stop Breathing, mezzo-soprano, piano
Night Music Mourning Music Final Music (1987/88), orchestra
Fantasy for Eight Players (1982), octet
Concertino per Orchestra (1981)
Chromatic Variation on a Waltz by Diabelli (1981), piano
Second Piano Concerto (1980/81), piano, orchestra
Six Love Songs on Baroque Texts (1980), baritone and harpsichord or piano
Sonetti in vita e in morte di Madonna Laura (1979), a cappella chorus
Projections on Themes of W. A. Mozart (1978), orchestra
Programme (1977/78), large orchestra
String Quartet (1978/79)
Concerto for Twelve Players (1978/79)
Contours (1977), piano
My Life, My Death (1976), baritone, instruments, and tape
Motus (1976), large orchestra
Plays (1975), 12 cellos, winds, and percussion
Short Stories (1974/75), eleven winds
Memento Vivere (1973/74), mezzo-soprano, baritone, 3 speakers, choir, orchestra
Mulitiplay – Canonic Reflections (1972/73), 23 players
Signum (1969), organ
Four Songs (1969), voice and instruments
Chronique (1968/69), orchestra
Ars Amatoria (1967), cantata for chorus, combo, and chamber orchestra
Four Movements on German Folksongs (1966), soprano, 3 instruments, chorus
Risonanze (1965/66), three orchestral groups
Kästner-Songbook (1962), medium voice, piano
Stories (1962), winds and percussion
Three Lyrical Chansons (1957), voice and chamber orchestra
Wedding Mail Cantata (1957), mixed chorus, harpsichord, and double bass
Allegro giocoso (1956), orchestra
Agustin Variations-Loga-rhythms (1956), orchestra
Figures and Fantasies (1956), orchestra
Concerto for Piano and Chamber Orchestra (1955)
Divertimento (1954), string orchestra
Musica Brevis (1950), orchestra

Literature
Harald Goerz. Gerhard Wimberger. Vienna: Lafitte, 1991.

Decorations and awards
 1967: Austrian State Prize for Music in the field of composition
 1979: Austrian Ministry of Education, Science and Culture Prize for Music
 1983: Austrian Cross of Honour for Science and Art, 1st class
 1991: Grand Decoration of Honour in Silver for Services to the Republic of Austria
 1992: Honorary Member of the Mozarteum University of Salzburg
 1994: Silver Mozart Medal of the International Mozarteum Foundation
 1998: Honorary Member of the International Mozarteum Foundation
 2003: Ring of Salzburg
 Gold decoration of Salzburg

References

1923 births
2016 deaths
Musicians from Vienna
Austrian classical composers
20th-century classical composers
Austrian opera composers
Male opera composers
Mozarteum University Salzburg alumni
Recipients of the Austrian State Prize
Recipients of the Austrian Cross of Honour for Science and Art, 1st class
Recipients of the Grand Decoration for Services to the Republic of Austria
Austrian male classical composers
20th-century male musicians